Mattos Nascimento (born 2 June 1954) is a Brazilian musician, singer, composer and trombonist. In the 1980s he used to perform with the famous Brazilian band Os Paralamas do Sucesso. Since he became a follower of Jesus Christ on 19 November 1989 he's been dedicating himself exclusively to a solo career, recording dozens of albums. He has his own music label called "Mattos Nascimento Discos" and was the pioneer in his family to get into the gospel music scene.

Discography 
Oh Glória!
Rei dos reis
Especial Ao Vivo
Céu de Luz
Você já Imaginou?
Jesus é o Rei
Muito Feliz
Sou vencedor
In Concert (vol 1 & 2)
Parece até um Sonho
À Sombra do Onipotente Descansará
Levanta a Bandeira
Jesus tem Misericórdia
Jesus Salva e dá Vitória
Jesus de Nazaré
Jesus El Nazareno
Vem
Liberdade
Harpa Cristã vol. 1
Harpa Cristã vol. 2
Na Unção do primeiro amor
Em Àguas Profundas
Canções Imortais
As primeiras canções
Grite para Todo Mundo Ouvir
Arma Poderosa
Inéditas – Ao Vivo
Grite para todo o mundo ouvir
Filho Pródigo

References

External links
 Official website
 Song lyrics

Living people
Brazilian gospel singers
20th-century Brazilian male singers
20th-century Brazilian singers
Brazilian trombonists
1954 births
21st-century trombonists
21st-century Brazilian male singers
21st-century Brazilian singers